Agostino Bertani (19 October 1812 – 10 April 1886) was an Italian revolutionary and physician during Italian unification.

Revolutionary

Bertani was born in Milan on 19 October 1812. His father was an administrator for the Napoleonic government of Lombardy. He graduated as a surgeon from the University of Pavia in 1835. After some travels, he settled down in 1839 to work as a surgeon in Milan. By 1848, he had been named the chief surgeon at  the Ospedale Maggiore of Milan. 

With the outbreak of the revolutions of 1848, he participated in the leadership. He fearlessly advocated for democracy, and thus was opposed to the fusion of Lombard republic with the Kingdom of Sardinia. Exiled from Lombardy, he gravitated to the Roman Republic of 1849, where as medical officer, organized another ambulance service similar to one he had established previously in Milan. After the fall of Rome, he withdrew to Genoa, where he worked with James Hudson, a British diplomat and supporter of Italian independence, for the freedom of Neapolitan political prisoners. 
In 1859 he founded a revolutionary journal at Genoa.

At the outbreak of the Second Italian War of Independence in 1859, he joined as surgeon for the Garibaldian corps of the Cacciatori delle Alpi. After the war ended with the Conference of Villafranca, he became one of the organizers of the Expedition of the Thousand against the Kingdom of the Two Sicilies. Remaining at Genoa after Garibaldi's departure for Marsala, he organized four separate volunteer corps, two of which were intended for Sicily and two for the Papal States. The Sardinian Prime Minister, Camillo Cavour, however, commanded all four corps to sail for Sicily. Bertani allocated many of his efforts to organize a democratic republican Italy, merging the energies of Mazzini and Garibaldi.

When Garibaldi took Naples, Bertani was appointed Garibaldi's secretary-general, in which capacity he reorganized the police, abolished the secret service fund, founded twelve infant asylums, prepared for the suppression of the religious orders, and planned the sanitary reconstruction of the city. He entered parliament in 1861 and opposed the Garibaldi's expedition against Rome. After Garibaldi was defeated at the Battle of Aspromonte in 1862, he treated Garibaldi's wounds. In 1866, during the Third Italian War of Independence, he organized the medical service for the 40,000 Garibaldians, and the following year fought at the Battle of Mentana.

Life in parliament

In 1866, Bertani founded a journal for social reform called La Riforma.

Bertani's parliamentary career was less successful than his revolutionary activity. After the capture of Rome in 1870 he became the leader of the extreme left in the new Italian parliament. His chief work as deputy was an inquiry into the sanitary conditions of the peasantry, and the preparation of the sanitary code adopted by the administration of Francesco Crispi. With the introduction of "transformismo" by Agostino Depretis in 1876, drawing ministers from the right and left, Bertani refused to enter the government. 
In 1885, along with Anna Maria Mozzoni, he made a visit to the anarchist Giovanni Passannante, imprisoned for attempted murder to King Umberto I, and denounced his prison conditions.

Bertani remained in parliament until his death on 10 April 1886.

References

Attribution

1812 births
1886 deaths
Politicians from Milan
Historical Left politicians
Historical Far Left politicians
Deputies of Legislature VIII of the Kingdom of Italy
Deputies of Legislature IX of the Kingdom of Italy
Deputies of Legislature X of the Kingdom of Italy
Deputies of Legislature XI of the Kingdom of Italy
Deputies of Legislature XII of the Kingdom of Italy
Deputies of Legislature XIII of the Kingdom of Italy
Deputies of Legislature XV of the Kingdom of Italy
Physicians from Milan
Italian revolutionaries